John A. Watkins is a United States Navy rear admiral (lower half) who currently serves as the deputy director of command, control, communications and computer systems and information technology of the United States Space Command since June 11, 2021. He previously served as the Deputy Commander of the United States Tenth Fleet and, prior to that, the Chief of Staff of the U.S. Fleet Cyber Command and United States Tenth Fleet.

References

External links

Year of birth missing (living people)
Living people
Place of birth missing (living people)
United States Navy admirals